The 2019 Al Habtoor Tennis Challenge was a professional tennis tournament played on outdoor hard courts. It was the twenty-first edition of the tournament which was part of the 2019 ITF Women's World Tennis Tour. It took place in Dubai, United Arab Emirates between 9 and 15 December 2019.

Singles main-draw entrants

Seeds

 1 Rankings are as of 2 December 2019.

Other entrants
The following players received wildcards into the singles main draw:
  Dalma Gálfi
  Urszula Radwańska
  Elena-Gabriela Ruse
  Mayar Sherif

The following players received entry from the qualifying draw:
  Akgul Amanmuradova
  Magdalena Fręch
  Georgina García Pérez
  Valentina Ivakhnenko
  Aleksandra Krunić
  Eléonora Molinaro
  Anastasiya Shoshyna
  Daria Snigur

Champions

Singles

 Ana Bogdan def.  Daria Snigur, 6–1, 6–2

Doubles

 Lucie Hradecká /  Andreja Klepač def.  Georgina García Pérez /  Sara Sorribes Tormo, 7–5, 3–6, [10–8]

References

External links
 2019 Al Habtoor Tennis Challenge at ITFtennis.com
 Official website

2019 ITF Women's World Tennis Tour
2019 in Emirati tennis
December 2019 sports events in Asia
Al Habtoor Tennis Challenge